American organist Joseph Arndt became Music Director at Saint John's Episcopal Church in Tulsa, Oklahoma in June 2015. He has taught harpsichord and early music at the University of Central Oklahoma and Oklahoma City University.

Prior to his move to Tulsa he was the Director of Music at Grace Church, Newark, NJ, one of the prominent Anglo-Catholic parishes in the eastern United States. He also was an assisting organist at Trinity Wall Street. He played continuo for Bach Vespers at Holy Trinity in New York for six years. He took his first church organist position at the age of 12 at St. Peter's-at-the-Light Episcopal Church in Barnegat Light, NJ. Prior to Grace Church, he held positions at St. Peter's Episcopal Church in Morristown, NJ, Christ Church, United Methodist in New York City, and Lamington Presbyterian Church in Bedminster, NJ.

Arndt is the recipient of numerous honors, including First Place awards at the West Chester University and Joan Lippincott Organ Competitions. He received a Bachelor of Music degree from Westminster Choir College and a Master of Music from The Juilliard School.  He was an Irene Diamond Graduate Fellowship recipient at The Juilliard School. Arndt's teachers include Paul Jacobs, Ken Cowan, and Diane Meredith Belcher.
 
Mr. Arndt has a significant interest in new music. Composers including Jonathan Dawe, Christian Carey, and Conrad Cummings have dedicated new organ works to him. He recorded Jonathan Dawe's work "Zipoli Automata" for the album "Piercing are the Darts."

He has performed organ recitals throughout the eastern United States, in addition to performances in England (including at the Clare College Chapel).

External links 
  Joe Arndt, Organist
 http://www.nj.com/news/index.ssf/2009/12/juilliard-trained_organist_bri.html
 http://www.huffingtonpost.com/wires/2009/12/01/juilliardtrained-organist_ws_375417.html
 http://ship-of-fools.com/mystery/2008/1628.html

American classical organists
American male organists
Westminster Choir College alumni
Juilliard School alumni
Living people
Year of birth missing (living people)
Place of birth missing (living people)
21st-century organists
21st-century American male musicians
21st-century American keyboardists
Male classical organists